The Portland Yamhill Historic District, located in downtown Portland, Oregon, is listed on the National Register of Historic Places.

From 1914 to 1934, the area included part of the Carroll Public Market.

The area covered, between the commercial center of Portland and the Willamette River, is within a 22-block section destroyed in the Great Fire of 1873;  it includes the Northrup and Blossom-Fitch Building (1858) from before the fire.  Rebuilding after the fire got into "full swing" in 1878;  the district includes 17 Italianate-style buildings built between 1878 and 1887.

Selected buildings in the district include:
Leon Chung Company Building
Rensselaer Block, built by W.S. Ham
Strowbridge Building, an Italianate masonry building
 Mikado Block
Moy Building (1910). the six-story Chicago School-style, also known as the Bellevue Hotel.
H.W. Corbett Building, 124 SW Yamhill
Willamette Block

See also
 National Register of Historic Places listings in Southwest Portland, Oregon

References

External links

1976 establishments in Oregon
Historic districts on the National Register of Historic Places in Oregon
Italianate architecture in Oregon
National Register of Historic Places in Portland, Oregon
Southwest Portland, Oregon